Saint Æthelwold of Farne (also spelled Aethelwald, Ethilwold, etc.) was a late 7th-century hermit who lived on Inner Farne, off the coast of the English county of Northumberland.

Little is known about this man, apart from what is recorded in the writings of the Venerable Bede. Æthelwold was both a priest and a monk from Ripon Abbey. Being desirous of some solitude, he succeeded to the tiny hermitage of Saint Cuthbert on Farne, after the latter's death in 687. He, however, found it so drafty that he was obliged to make much needed repairs using a calfskin. The best-known story about Æthelwold, relates how the future Abbot Guthrid visited him on his island with two Lindisfarne monks and, on his journey home, was saved from shipwreck by the saint's prayers. Æthelwold died on 23 March (which is his feast day) 699 (not 720 as is sometimes stated). He was buried with Cuthbert and, like him, was eventually enshrined in Durham Cathedral. He should not be confused with his near contemporary, Saint Æthelwold of Lindisfarne.

References
Farmer, David Hugh. (1978). The Oxford Dictionary of Saints. Oxford: Oxford University Press.

Specific

External links
 
Newman Reader: History of St. Edelwald

Northumbrian saints
7th-century English clergy
English hermits
7th-century births
699 deaths
English Christian monks
7th-century Christian saints
7th-century Christian monks